Pedro Septién Orozco (March 21, 1916 – December 19, 2013) was a Mexican sports broadcaster. He was nicknamed El Mago (Spanish for "The Wizard"). Septien was famous in Mexico due to his vast knowledge about Major League Baseball. He worked for Televisa during most of his career in TV. He was also known as the play-by-play announcer for the Tigres del México baseball team.

Pedro Septién died at his home in Mexico City, of pneumonia.

Movies

Septién acted in several movies, as a sports broadcaster:

La venganza de Huracán Ramirez (1967)
El hijo de Huracán Ramírez (1966)
Juventud sin Dios (1962)
Piernas de oro (1958)
Pepito as del volante (1957)
Huracán Ramírez (1953)
Una calle entre tú y yo (1952)
El luchador fenómeno (1952)
El beisbolista fenómeno (1952)
Campeón sin corona (1946)

References

External links
 IMDb article on Pedro "El Mago" Septién
 Mexican Baseball Hall of the Fame, page dedicated to Pedro Septién
 Dialogo Queretano article dedicated to Pedro Septién

Mexican Baseball Hall of Fame inductees
Mexican television personalities
Sportspeople from Querétaro City
1916 births
2013 deaths
Deaths from pneumonia in Mexico